The Atsumi Kiln (渥美窯 Atsumigama) is a generic name for a historic kiln that dates from the late Heian period to the Kamakura period (early 12th century until the 13th century). It was located on the Atsumi Peninsula in Aichi prefecture.

A pot with a design of autumn grasses called akikusamon was discovered in the Hakusan Burial Mound. It dates to the Heian period, during the late 12th century, and is registered as a National Treasure.

References

External links 

 http://www.tnm.jp/modules/r_collection/index.php?controller=dtl_img&size=L&colid=E15464&t=type&id=34&lang=en

Culture in Aichi Prefecture
History of Aichi Prefecture
Japanese pottery kiln sites